Galerías Preciados, S.A. was a Spanish chain of department stores founded in 1943 by José "Pepín" Fernández Rodríguez. Named after the street on which it stood, Galerías Preciados was, along with El Corte Inglés, one of the economic motors of the retail industry in post-war Spain.

In 1995, the company went into receivership and was subsequently adjudicated to its main rival.

Stores

 Barcelona
 Cádiz
 Avenida Ronda de los Tejares, Córdoba
 Carrera de la Virgen, Granada
 Plaza de las Monjas, Huelva 
 Calle Preciados, Madrid
 Gran Vía, Murcia
 Calle de Uria, Oviedo
 Paseo Independencia, Saragosse
 Calle San Pablo/Calle Méndez Núñez, Seville
 Plaza de la Magdalena/Calle O´Donnell, Seville
 Calle Constitución, Valladolid

See also
 SEPU

References

Retail companies established in 1943
Retail companies disestablished in 1995
Companies based in the Community of Madrid
Department stores of Spain
1943 establishments in Spain
1995 disestablishments in Spain
Defunct department stores